Jalakanyaka is a 1971 Indian Malayalam film, directed by M. S. Mani. The film stars Madhu, Kaviyoor Ponnamma, Jose Prakash and Manavalan Joseph in the lead roles. The film had musical score by A. T. Ummer.

Cast

Madhu
Kaviyoor Ponnamma
Jose Prakash
Manavalan Joseph
Pattom Sadan
P. J. Antony
Jesey
Kottarakkara Sreedharan Nair
Meena
Nellikode Bhaskaran
Ushanandini

Soundtrack
The music was composed by A. T. Ummer and the lyrics were written by Dr. Pavithran.

References

External links
 

1971 films
1970s Malayalam-language films